is a female kami in Japanese mythology.

During the myth of the Birth of the Gods, in which the goddess Izanami died after giving birth to the fire deity Kagu-tsuchi, Izanagi clung to his wife's dead body and cried. From his tears, Nakisawame emerged. She is considered a spirit of spring water.  The goddess' name is composed of the words saki meaning "weeping" and naki, and epithet of crying. Me denotes that she is female.

In the Kojiki she is also named .

Japanese gods
Amatsukami